Bronisław Łagowski (born February 8, 1937) is a Polish professor emeritus of the Jagellonian University and Cracow Pedagogical University, expert in political philosophy and essayist.

In 2000 he was awarded Officer's Cross of the Order of Polonia Restituta, one of the highest Polish orders.

Publications

He is an author of numerous publications in press ("Tygodnik Powszechny", "Gazeta Wyborcza", "Zdanie", "Polityka", "Przegląd", "Krytyka Polityczna").

Books

 Filozofia polityczna Maurycego Mochnackiego ('Political philosophy of Maurycy Mochnacki'), Wydawnictwo Literackie. Kraków 1981, .
 Co jest lepsze od prawdy? ('What is better than truth?'), Wydawnictwo Literackie. Kraków 1986, .
 Liberalna kontrrewolucja ('Liberal counter-revolution'), Adam Smith Centre 1994, .
 Szkice antyspołeczne ('Antisocial sketches'), Księgarnia Akademicka, .
 Łagodny protest obywatelski ('Gentle cvic protest'), Księgarnia Akademicka, .
 Duch i bezduszność III Rzeczypospolitej. Rozważania. ('Spirit and heartlerssness of the Third Republic'), Universitas, .
 Pochwała politycznej bierności ('In praise of political pssivity'), Wydawnictwo Sprawy Polityczne. Warszawa 2008, .
 Teka Łagowskiego. Księga Jubileuszowa z okazji 70. urodzin Profesora Bronisława Łagowskiego (an anniversary book on Łagowski's 70th birthday), Księgarnia Akademicka. Kraków 2008, .
 Symbole pożarły rzeczywistość ('Symbols devoured the reality'), Universitas. Kraków 2011, .
 Polska chora na Rosję ('Poland's sickness Russia') Oratio Recta. Warszawa 2016, .
 Fałszywa historia, błędna polityka ('False history, wrong politics'), Oratio Recta. Warszawa 2017, .
 Państwo znikąd ('A state from nowhere'), Oratio Recta. Warszawa 2017, .

Awards and recognition

 Officer's Cross of the Order of Polonia Restituta(2000),
 Badge "Honoris Gratia" from President of the City of Cracow (2007)
 Medal of the ecumenic foundation Tolerancja.

References

1937 births
Living people
Polish political scientists